Launcher is an American aerospace company based in Hawthorne, California. It was founded in New York in 2017 by Max Haot.

In February 2019, the company presented it's E-2 engine, which was made in Germany by AMCM using its specialized M4K printer. The engine uses liquid oxygen and kerosene propellants. The company's Launcher Light rocket was designed to carry payloads of up to 150 kg to low-earth orbit.

In November 2019, the US Air Force awarded the company $1.5 million to accelerate development and testing of its E-2 rocket engine.

In March 2021, Launcher moved its headquarters from New York to a 24,000-square-foot building in Hawthorne, California.

In February 2023, Launcher was acquired by Vast, a startup company developing artificial gravity space stations, with Max Haot becoming president of Vast.

Orbiter 
The company has developed an orbital transfer vehicle named Orbiter that uses ethane and nitrous oxide as propellants for use as the third stage of the canceled Light rocket, or for use on other launch vehicles. In June 2021, the company raised $11.7 million in a Series-A round of funding to accelerate the development of its first orbital vehicle. Orbiter is compatible with both Launcher Light and SpaceX Falcon rideshare flights.

SN1, Orbiter's first mission was launched on 3 January 2023 from Cape Canaveral, Florida on SpaceX's Falcon 9 Transporter-6 rideshare flight, transporting payload from eight customers. SN1 failed shortly after deployment, with all customer payloads lost.

Missions

See also 

 Relativity Space
 Isar Aerospace
 Rocket Factory Augsburg AG
 Vector Launch
 Orbex
 Skyrora
 PLD Space
 Radian Aerospace

References

External links 
 Official Website

Aerospace companies of the United States
Private spaceflight companies
Companies based in Seattle